General Humphrey may refer to:

Charles F. Humphrey Jr. (1876–1968), U.S. Army brigadier general
Charles Frederic Humphrey Sr. (1844–1926), U.S. Army major general
Evan Harris Humphrey (1875–1963), U.S. Army brigadier general